For the Love of Mike  (originally titled Hell's Kitchen) is a 1927 American silent romantic drama film. Directed by Frank Capra, it starred Claudette Colbert (in her film debut) and Ben Lyon. It is now considered to be a lost film.

Plot
A baby boy is found abandoned in a Hell's Kitchen tenement and subsequently is raised by three men: a German delicatessen owner (Sterling), a Jewish tailor (Sidney), and an Irish street cleaner (Cameron). They adopt the boy and raise him as their own. The timeline jumps 20 years into their future. The now-grown Mike (Lyon) resists going to college because he does not wish to be a financial burden to his adoptive fathers, however a pretty Italian girl, Mary (Colbert) working at the delicatessen convinces him to go.

Mike enrolls at Yale and gains a reputation as a sports hero.  He disavows his three fathers, which leads to the Irishman giving him a thrashing in front of the boy's best friends.  He begins to associate with gamblers and ends up owing them money. To settle his debts, they demand he purposely lose the school's big rowing match with Harvard. His three fathers and the girl come to support him during the race, and he defies the gamblers and wins the race. His three fathers then come forward to confront and deal with the gamblers.

Cast
Ben Lyon as Mike
Claudette Colbert as Mary
George Sidney as Abraham Katz
Ford Sterling as Herman Schultz
Hugh Cameron as Patrick O'Malley
Richard "Skeets" Gallagher as Coxey Pendleton
Rudolph Cameron as Henry Sharp
Mabel Swor as Evelyn Joyce

Background
For the Love of Mike is based on the story Hell's Kitchen by John Moroso.  Frank Capra himself referred to the film as his first flop. Having recently ended his association as writer for actor Harry Langdon, this became Capra's first opportunity to direct a New York based production.  Producer Robert Kane had contracts to provide First National Pictures with 10 films, and had planned each to be financed with profits from the preceding.

For the Love of Mike was the tenth in this package, funding was limited, and agent Leland Hayward convinced Capra into deferring his salary until the end of production.  Capra was never paid for his participation.  The film was considered a commercial failure despite a strong cast and decent production values.

The film is marked as being the screen debut of Claudette Colbert and her only silent film appearance.  After the film received poor reviews and failed financially, Colbert vowed, "I shall never make another film". However, two years later, she signed with Paramount Pictures.

Reception
Critic Mordaunt Hall of The New York Times wrote that the film "makes no pretensions of being anything but a movie. It seemed to satisfy the audience at the Hippodrome yesterday afternoon, for there was laughter and, at the end, applause", and concluded "Claudette Colbert, who was seen in Kenyon Nicholson's play "The Barker," lends her charm to this obstreperous piece of work. She seems quite at home before the camera".

See also
List of lost films

References

External links
 
 
 
 For the Love of Mike at Silentera.com 

1927 films
1927 romantic drama films
American silent feature films
American romantic drama films
American black-and-white films
Films directed by Frank Capra
First National Pictures films
Lost American films
1927 lost films
Lost romantic drama films
1920s American films
Silent romantic drama films
Silent American drama films